In mathematics, a k-ultrahomogeneous graph is a graph in which every isomorphism between two of its induced subgraphs of at most k vertices can be extended to an automorphism of the whole graph. A k-homogeneous graph obeys a weakened version of the same property in which every isomorphism between two induced subgraphs implies the existence of an automorphism of the whole graph that maps one subgraph to the other (but does not necessarily extend the given isomorphism).

A homogeneous graph is a graph that is k-homogeneous for every k, or equivalently k-ultrahomogeneous for every k.

Classification
The only finite homogeneous graphs are the cluster graphs mKn formed from the disjoint unions of isomorphic complete graphs, the Turán graphs formed as the complement graphs of mKn, the 3 × 3 rook's graph, and the 5-cycle.

The only countably infinite homogeneous graphs are the disjoint unions of isomorphic complete graphs (with the size of each complete graph, the number of complete graphs, or both numbers countably infinite), their complement graphs, the Henson graphs together with their complement graphs, and the Rado graph.

If a graph is 5-ultrahomogeneous, then it is ultrahomogeneous for every k.
There are only two connected graphs that are 4-ultrahomogeneous but not 5-ultrahomogeneous: the Schläfli graph and its complement. The proof relies on the classification of finite simple groups.

Variations
A graph is connected-homogeneous if every isomorphism between two connected induced subgraphs can be extended to an automorphism of the whole graph.
In addition to the homogeneous graphs, the finite connected-homogeneous graphs include all cycle graphs, all square rook's graphs, the Petersen graph, and the 5-regular Clebsch graph.

Notes

References

.
.
.
.
.
.
.
.

Graph families